The Presidential Task Force on the Auto Industry was an ad hoc group of United States cabinet-level and other officials that was formed by President Obama to deal with the financial bailout of automakers Chrysler and General Motors.
 
Based on an assessment that automobile manufacturing was a critical sector of the economy providing 3 to 4 million jobs for Americans, that liquidation was imminent for two of the three major U.S. automakers, and that the break ups would devastate the U.S. economy, the U.S. government became involved in the day-to-day management decisions of Chrysler and General Motors through the Task Force.

The Presidential Task Force formed and started holding meetings in February 2009. It reviewed financial and operational restructuring plans submitted by Chrysler and General Motors (GM) and made its own specific recommendations at cabinet level meetings to the President regarding the restructurings and the requests for funds from the companies. Recommendations also included directives on improving wage and benefit structures, and developing competitive fuel efficient cars for the future. In March 2009, the Task Force recommended up to $5 billion in support for automotive industry suppliers, and by late May 2009, following the recommendations of the Task Force, the U.S. government had lent approximately $25 billion in total to the companies. At that time, it was estimated that GM might require $30 billion more to emerge from bankruptcy. By mid-July 2009, both companies had restructured and emerged from bankruptcy. The Task Force was scaled back from "day to day" involvement to periodic "monitoring".

According to an April 2014 report of the Special Inspector General of the Troubled Asset Relief Program, the U.S. government had lost $11.2 billion in its rescue of General Motors. The U.S. government spent $50 billion to bail out GM, meaning it recovered 77.6 percent of its investment amount.

Members and Official Designees
The Task Force was composed of the following cabinet members and public officials:

Members
Co-chairs:
Secretary of the Treasury, Tim Geithner 
National Economic Council Director, Larry Summers 
Secretary of Transportation 
Secretary of Commerce 
Secretary of Labor 
Secretary of Energy 
Chair of the President’s Council of Economic Advisers, Christina Romer
Director of the Office of Management and Budget, Peter R. Orszag 
Environmental Protection Agency Administrator 
Director of the White House Office of Energy and Climate Change  
Lead Auto Advisor at the Treasury Department, Steven Rattner
Senior Advisor on Auto Issues at the Treasury Department, Ron Bloom
Senior Advisor on Auto Issues at the Treasury Department, Harry Wilson

Official designees
Of the Members of the Presidential Task Force:

Diana Farrell, Deputy Director, National Economic Council 
Gene Sperling, Counselor to the Secretary of Treasury 
Jared Bernstein, Chief Economist to Vice President Biden 
Jay Williams, Senior Advisor, Department of Labor 
Lisa Heinzerling, Senior Climate Policy Counsel to the EPA Administrator 
Austan Goolsbee, Staff Director and Chief Economist of the Economic Recovery Advisory Board 
Dan Utech, Senior Advisor to the Secretary of Energy 
Heather Zichal, Deputy Director, White House Office of Energy and Climate Change 
Joan DeBoer, Chief of Staff, Department of Transportation 
Rick Wade, Senior Advisor,  Department of Commerce

Staff
Brian Deese, special assistant to the president for economic policy

See also
 Automotive industry crisis of 2008–2010
 Corporate welfare
 Effects of the 2008–2010 automotive industry crisis on the United States
 List of U.S. executive branch czars

References

United States Department of the Treasury
Automotive industry in the United States
2008 in economics
Great Recession in the United States
2000s economic history
Task forces
United States national commissions
United States Presidential Task Forces
Presidency of Barack Obama